Giacomo Conti (born 21 July 1999) is a Sammarinese footballer who plays as a defender for San Giovanni and the San Marino national team.

Career
Conti made his international debut for San Marino on 7 October 2020 in a friendly match against Slovenia, which finished as a 0–4 away loss.

Career statistics

International

References

External links
 
 

1999 births
Living people
Sammarinese footballers
San Marino youth international footballers
San Marino under-21 international footballers
San Marino international footballers
Association football defenders
A.S.D. Victor San Marino players